Robert Edward Hunter (November 20, 1886 – March 28, 1971) was an American amateur golfer who competed in the 1904 Summer Olympics. In 1904, Hunter was part of the American team which won the gold medal. He finished fourth in this competition. In the individual competition he finished 14th in the qualification and was eliminated in the second round of the match play.

Hunter won the collegiate championship in 1910.

References

External links
 profile

American male golfers
Amateur golfers
Golfers at the 1904 Summer Olympics
Olympic gold medalists for the United States in golf
Medalists at the 1904 Summer Olympics
1886 births
1971 deaths